The Changshu–Taizhou Expressway, commonly referred to as the Changtai Expressway, is an expressway that connects the cities of Changshu, a satellite city of Suzhou, in the province of Jiangsu, China, and Taizhou, in the province of Zhejiang. When fully complete, it will be  in length. The expressway is a spur of the G15 Shenyang–Haikou Expressway. The spur line splits off from the main expressway at Changshu and passes through the cities of Suzhou, Jiaxing, and Shaoxing before rejoining the main expressway just north of Taizhou, Zhejiang.

The expressway was finished when a section between Jiaxing and Shaoxing, which includes a bridge over the Hangzhou Bay, was constructed in 2013. This bridge was the second bridge over the bay, the first being the Hangzhou Bay Bridge, which carries the G15 Shenyang–Haikou Expressway and the G92 Hangzhou Bay Ring Expressway.

References

Proposed roads in China
Chinese national-level expressways
Expressways in Jiangsu
Expressways in Zhejiang